Chionaspis pinifoliae, the pine needle scale insect, is a common species of scale insect found on pine, spruce and other conifers across Canada and throughout the United States. The species is particularly persistent on planted spruce in the Prairie Provinces in both rural and urban settings. In heavy populations, the needles may appear to be flecked with white. The insect overwinters in the egg stage under the white covering of the scale. In Saskatchewan, hatching dates vary from late May to late June. The newly hatched “crawlers” disperse, settle on old or new needles and begin scale development.

References

Insects of Canada
Category:Insects of the United States]]
Insects described in 1856
Diaspididae